Vineuil is a commune in the Indre department, Centre-Val de Loire, France.

Population

See also
Communes of the Indre department

References

Communes of Indre